Dirk Ahlborn is an entrepreneur, investor, and an American businessman. He is from Berlin and currently works in California; he holds a U.S. citizenship and is the founder and Chairman of Hyperloop Transportation Technologies and CEO of Jumpstarter, Inc.

Career

Early career
In 1993, his career started as an investment specialist in Berlin, Germany.

When he was 19 years old, he quit his job in the bank.

In the 1990s, after moving to Italy, Ahlborn founded several companies in the alternative energy and interior design sphere. Ahlborn left Europe and joined the Girvan Institute of Technology, a non-profit incubator, and co-working space. The institute, located in Southern California, was created to assist NASA's Ames Research Center. While working on his kitchenware company, he started thinking about ways to apply the co-working notions elsewhere.

JumpStarter, Inc 
He co-founded and became CEO of Jumpstarter in 2013, the company that developed the crowdsourcing platform JumpStartFund in El Segundo, California.

References

Living people
21st-century American businesspeople
American technology chief executives
American technology company founders
Fellows of the Royal Society
Hyperloop
Industrial designers
Year of birth missing (living people)
Place of birth missing (living people)